Croydon is a district in the London Borough of Croydon, England. It may also refer to:

Places

Australia
 One of two places in Sydney in the state of New South Wales:
 Croydon, New South Wales
 Croydon Park, New South Wales
 Croydon, Queensland, a town in the north of Queensland
 Shire of Croydon, a local government area for the Queensland town of Croydon
 Town of Croydon, a former local government area for the Queensland town of Croydon
 One of three places in Adelaide in the state of South Australia:
 Croydon, South Australia
 Croydon Park, South Australia
 West Croydon, South Australia
 One of a number of places in the City of Maroondah, an eastern suburb of the city of Melbourne, in the state of Victoria:
 Croydon, Victoria
 Croydon Hills, Victoria
 Croydon North, Victoria
 Croydon South, Victoria
 A pastoral lease in the Goldfields of Western Australia:
Croydon Station

Canada
 Croydon, Ontario, a hamlet in Eastern Ontario

New Zealand
 Croydon Bush, New Zealand, in Southland, New Zealand

South Africa 
 Croydon, Kempton Park, a suburb in Gauteng

United Kingdom
 London Borough of Croydon
 County Borough of Croydon
 Croydon, the major town in the borough
 South Croydon, a town just south of the centre of Croydon
 Croydon South (historic UK Parliament constituency) 
 Croydon South (UK Parliament constituency) 
 Croydon North (UK Parliament constituency) 
 Croydon Central (UK Parliament constituency) 
 Croydon Aerodrome
 Croydon Pirates baseball team
 Croydon, Cambridgeshire, a village in Cambridgeshire

United States
 Croydon, New Hampshire, a town in Sullivan County
 Croydon, Pennsylvania, a town in Bucks County
 Croydon, Utah, a town in Morgan County

Other uses
Croydon (carriage), a type of horse-drawn carriage
Croydon facelift, a hairstyle
Croydon station (disambiguation), stations of the name
 Electoral district of Croydon in Australia:
 Electoral district of Croydon (South Australia), an electorate of the South Australian House of Assembly
 Electoral district of Croydon (New South Wales), a former electorate of the New South Wales Legislative Assembly
 Electoral district of Croydon (Queensland), a former electorate of the Queensland Legislative Assembly

See also
Corydon (disambiguation)